Schaefer Head is a  mountain in the Allegheny Mountains of Pennsylvania. It is one of the peaks that make up the Blue Knob massif, an isolated group of mountains that stand apart from the Allegheny Front. Schaefer Head is the third highest of these peaks behind Blue Knob 3,146  feet (959 m),and Herman Point 3,034 feet (925 m). Schaefer Head is also the highest point in Blair County.

Shaefer Head is conspicuous because of its cone shaped profile. There are no roads to the summit and the only way to the top is to bushwhack.

References
 

Mountains of Pennsylvania
Allegheny Mountains
Landforms of Blair County, Pennsylvania